Kiest station is a DART Light Rail station in Dallas, Texas. It serves the Oak Cliff neighborhood on Kiest Boulevard and Lancaster Road (SH 342).

References

External links 
 DART - Kiest Station

Dallas Area Rapid Transit light rail stations in Dallas
Railway stations in the United States opened in 1997
1997 establishments in Texas
Railway stations in Dallas County, Texas